Aylett is a given name and surname. Notable people with the name include:

Given name
Aylett Hawes (1768–1833), American politician and planter
Aylett Hawes Buckner (1816–1894), American politician
Richard Aylett Buckner (1763–1847), American politician
Aylett R. Cotton (1826–1912), American politician
Aylett Sammes  (c. 1636 – c. 1679), English antiquary

Surname
Allen Aylett (1934–2022), Australian rules football player and administrator, dentist
Bill Aylett (1900–1976), Australian politician
Charley Aylett (1913–1966), Australian politician
Kurt Aylett (born 1992), Australian rules footballer 
Robert Aylett (1583–1655), English lawyer and religious poet
Ruth Aylett (born 1951), British computer science professor
Steve Aylett (born 1967), English author